Geoffrey Norman Edward Hall-Say (27 April 1864 – 21 January 1940) was a British figure skater. He won the bronze medal in the special figures event at the 1908 Summer Olympics, became one of the oldest figure skating Olympic medalists. This was the only year in which special figures was an Olympic event. Fellow Brit Arthur Cumming won the silver.

References

Sources
 British medal winners, 1908 Olympics
 Geoffrey Hall-Say at databaseOlympics.com

External links
 
 

1864 births
1940 deaths
British male single skaters
Olympic figure skaters of Great Britain
Olympic bronze medallists for Great Britain
Olympic medalists in figure skating
Figure skaters at the 1908 Summer Olympics
Medalists at the 1908 Summer Olympics
20th-century British people